Taghut (ar. طاغوت, ṭāġūt. pl. ṭawāġīt. broadly: "to go beyond the measure") is Islamic terminology denoting a focus of  worship other than God. In traditional theology, the term often connotes idols or demons drawn to blood of pagan sacrifices.
In modern times, the term is also applied to earthly tyrannical power, as implied in surah An-Nisa verse 60. The modern Islamic philosopher Abul A'la Maududi defines taghut in his Quranic commentary as a creature who not only rebels against God but transgresses his will. Due to these associations, in recent times the term may refer to any person or group accused of being anti-Islamic and an agent of Western cultural imperialism. The term was introduced to modern political discourse since the usage surrounding Ayatollah Ruhollah Khomeini during the 1979 Iranian Revolution, through accusations made both by and against Khomeini.

Etymology
The Arabic word  is commonly seen as derived from the three-letter Arabic verbal root of  T-G-T which means to "cross the limits, overstep boundaries," or "to rebel." From this, Taghut denotes one who exceeds their limits.

In the Quran
The term taghut occurs eight times in the Quran. In Pre-Islamic Arabia referring to pagan deities such as Al-Lat and Al-Uzza.

This is taken to refer to an actual event in which a group of disbelieving Meccans went to two eminent Jewish figures for counsel on the truth of Muhammad's teachings and were told that the pagans were more rightly guided than Muslims.

The Arabic taghut is variously interpreted to refer to idols, a specific tyrant, an oracle, or an opponent of the Prophet.

Again, this term taghut has been used here to designate a demon worshipped by the Quraysh.

See also

References

Arabic words and phrases in Sharia
Idolatry
Islamic terminology
Sharia legal terminology